Kedarnath is a town and Nagar Panchayat in Rudraprayag district of Uttarakhand, India, known primarily for the Kedarnath Temple. It is approximately 86 kilometres from Rudraprayag, the district headquarter. Kedarnath is the most remote of the four Chota Char Dham pilgrimage sites. The town is flanked by snow-capped peaks, most prominently the Kedarnath Mountain. The nearest road head is at Gaurikund about 16 km away. The town suffered extensive destruction during June 2013 from the Flash Floods caused by torrential rains in Uttarakhand state.

Etymology
The name "Kedarnath" means "the Lord of the Field". It is derived from the Sanskrit words kedara ("field") and natha ("lord"). The text Kashi Kedara Mahatmya states that it is so-called because "the crop of liberation" grows here.

History 
Kedarnath has been a pilgrimage centre since ancient times.The temple's construction is credited  to the Pandava brothers mentioned in the Mahabharata. However, the Mahabharata does not mention any place called Kedarnath. One of the earliest references to Kedarnath occurs in the Skanda Purana (c. 7th-8th century), which names Kedara (Kedarnath) as the place where Lord Shiva released the holy waters of Ganga from his matted hair, resulting in the formation of the Ganges River.

According to the hagiographies based on Madhava's Sankshepa-Shankara-Vijaya, the 8th century philosopher Adi Shankaracharya died near the Kedarnath mountains; although other hagiographies, based on Anandagiri's Prachina-Shankara-Vijaya, state that he died at Kanchipuram. The ruins of a monument marking the purported resting place of Adi Shankaracharya are located at Kedarnath. Kedarnath was definitely a prominent pilgrimage centre by the 12th century when it is mentioned in Kritya-kalpataru written by the Gahadavala minister Bhatta Lakshmidhara.

Location

The township is built on a barren stretch of land on the shores of Mandakini river. The surrounding scenery of the Himalayas and green pastures makes it a very attractive place for pilgrimage and trekking.

Demographics
As of the 2011 India census, Kedarnath has a population of 830. Males constitute 99% of the population and females 1%. Kedarnath has an average literacy rate of 63%: male literacy is 63%, and female literacy is 36%. Out of total population, 604 were engaged in work or business activity. Of this 601 were males while 3 were females. Kedarnath, none of the population is under six years of age. The floating population from May to October every year is more than 5000 per day with the pilgrim influx rising upto 10 lacs (1 million) in 2022.

Climate
The Kedarnath Temple is closed during the winter months due to heavy snowfall. For six months, from November to April, the palanquin with the Utsava Murti (Idol) of Kedarnath and of the Madhyamaheshwar Temple is brought to the Omkareshwar Temple in Ukhimath, near Guptakashi. Priests and other summer-time residents also move to nearby villages to cope with the winter. Around 360 families of the Tirtha Purohit of 55 villages and other nearby villages are dependent on the town for livelihood.
According to the Köppen-Geiger climate classification system, Kedarnath's climate is monsoon-influenced subarctic climate (Dwc), bordering a uniform rainfall subarctic climate (Dfc) with mild, rainy summers and cold, snowy winters.

2013 flash floods

On 16 June 2013, at approximately 7:30 P.M., a landslide occurred near the Kedarnath Temple. Water from the Chorabari Tal or Gandhi Tal down Mandakini River also washed away everything in its path at about 8:30 p.m. On 17 June 2013 at approximately 6:40 a.m., waters rushed down from Chorabari Tal or Gandhi Sarovar, bringing along with its flow, a huge amount of silt, rocks, and boulders. A huge boulder got stuck behind the Kedarnath Temple, protecting it from the ravages of the flood. The flood-water gushed on both sides of the temple, destroying everything in its path. Thus in the middle of the pilgrimage season, torrential rains, cloud bursts, and resulting flash floods nearly destroyed the town of Kedarnath. The town was the worst affected area by the floods. Thousands of people were killed, and thousands of others (mostly pilgrims) were reported missing or stranded due to landslides around Kedarnath. Although the surrounding area and compound of the Kedarnath Temple were destroyed, the temple itself survived. 

The rescue operation resulted in more than 100,000 people being airlifted with the help of mainly the Private Helicopter Operators, who began the rescue mission voluntarily without any clear directives from the State Government or the Ministry of Defence. The Indian Army and Indian Air Force helicopters arrived much after the Private Helicopter Operators had already begun the massive air-rescue mission. Dare-devil helicopter pilots, mostly ex-Indian Air Force and Ex-Army Aviation officers, flew relentlessly. Capt. Unni Krishnan from Prabhatam Aviation & Capt. Bhatnagar from Premair were few such outstanding pilots who landed at the Sh. Kedarnath Ji right-ridge at dusk hours - 1910hrs (almost 35 minutes after 'sunset') to pick-up the 'last' batch of survivors for the day. The NDRF represented by a commandant, and another junior officer arrived at the 'right-ridge' of the town bordering the Mandakini River, unprepared with a malfunctioning satellite phone. However, the next day, they brought in more men and supplies. The first Indian Army officer to arrive at the Sh. Kedarnath Ji 'right-ridge' was a Captain from the Assam Rifles Regiment. He single-handedly displayed exemplary courage in rescuing many survivors by climbing up steep slopes and fractures along the Rambara ridge-line. The Indian Army later launched a massive rescue effort with thousands of its brave-heart men and vital equipment. The Indo-Tibetan Border Police and the reserve battalions of the Uttarakhand Police displayed outstanding courage in the rescue mission. A Eurocopter AS350 B3 helicopter, each, of the private helicopter operators - Prabhatam Aviation & Simm Samm Aviation, were lost during the rescue mission without any reported casualties. An Indian Air Force helicopter (Mi 17) also crashed during this exercise, killing all 20 people on board (all of them were soldiers involved in relief and rescue work). The Air Force dropped logs to build pyres for mass cremations of the victims.  It was reported that previously uncollected bodies were still being found one year after the tragedy.

Flood-proof infrastructure plan 
After the floods, the Government of India decided to provide a flood-free infrastructure plan for the town. This involves:
 Development of the retaining wall and ghats on the Mandakini River
 Development of the retaining wall and ghats on the Sarasvati River
 Construction of the main approach to the Kedarnath Temple
 Development of the Adi Shankaracharya Kutir and Museum
 Development of houses for the Kedarnath Teerth Purohits

The foundation stone for the plan was laid by Prime Minister Narendra Modi on 20 October 2017.

Places of interest
Other than the Kedarnath Temple, on the eastern side of the town is Bhairavnath Temple, and the deity of this temple, Bhairavnath, is believed to protect the town during the winter months.
About 6 km upstream from the town, lies Chorabari Tal, a lake cum glacier also called Gandhi Sarovar. Near Kedarnath, there is a cliff called Bhairav Jhamp. Other places of interest include the Kedarnath Wildlife Sanctuary, Adi Shankaracharya Samadhi, and Rudra meditation cave.

See also

 Kedarnath (mountain)
 Badrinath
 2013 North India floods

References

Dictionary of Hindu Lore and Legend by Anna Dhallapiccola

External links
 Official website

 

Hindu holy cities
Shaivism
Cities and towns in Rudraprayag district
Hindu pilgrimage sites in India
Tourism in Uttarakhand
Chota Char Dham temples
Panch Kedar